Lidderdale may refer to:

People
 Charles Sillem Lidderdale (1830-1895), British painter
 Kathleen Lidderdale (1894 - 1973), English hockey and tennis player
 William Lidderdale (1832–1902), governor of the Bank of England

Places
 Lidderdale, Iowa, United States

Biology
 Lidderdale's dawnfly (Capila lidderdali), a butterfly of India and Southeast Asia